David Hoskins is a television writer who has written several episodes of The Bill and Midsomer Murders. He began writing for The Bill in 1990 with Jumping the Gun, writing an additional 23, and for Midsomer Murders in 2001 with Destroying Angel, writing an additional 9 to date.

References 

Year of birth missing (living people)
Living people
British television writers
Place of birth missing (living people)